Events from the year 1850 in Scotland.

Incumbents

Law officers 
 Lord Advocate – Andrew Rutherfurd
 Solicitor General for Scotland – Thomas Maitland; then James Moncreiff

Judiciary 
 Lord President of the Court of Session and Lord Justice General – Lord Boyle
 Lord Justice Clerk – Lord Glencorse

Events 
 1 April – Aberdeen Railway opens to a terminus at Ferryhill, Aberdeen.
 15 April – iron paddle steamer , launched on 28 February by Tod & Macgregor of Partick, makes her maiden voyage as the first steamer on the Glasgow–New York route.
 18 June – paddle steamer Orion sinks off Portpatrick through the negligence of her master with the loss of 50 lives.
 17 October – James Young patents a method of distilling paraffin from coal, laying the foundations for the Scottish paraffin industry.
 December – destitute Gaelic speakers from the island of Barra begin to appear in Glasgow, displaced by the Highland Clearances.
 Cox Brothers open the Camperdown Works in Dundee which will become the world's largest jute works.
 Remodelling of Dunrobin Castle completed.
 Skara Brae revealed by weather.

Births 
 4 February – Thomas Lomar Gray, seismologist (died 1908 in the United States)
 24 April – Murdo MacKenzie, businessman (died 1939 in the United States)
 30 April – George Gibb, transport administrator (died 1925 in London)
 12 May – Charles McLaren, 1st Baron Aberconway, jurist, landowner, industrialist and Unionist politician (died 1934 in London)
 14 June – Eliza Humphreys, née Gollan (pen name 'Rita'), novelist (died 1938 in England)
 13 August – Peter Drummond, steam locomotive engineer (died 1918)
 22 August – William Morrison, chemist, creator of an electric carriage (died 1927 in the United States)
 13 November – Robert Louis Stevenson, novelist, poet, essayist and travel writer (died 1894 in Samoa)
 11 December – Mary Victoria Douglas-Hamilton, married into European nobility (died 1922 in Budapest)

Deaths 
 26 January – Francis Jeffrey, Lord Jeffrey, judge and literary critic (born 1773)
 5 June – Thomas Brown, architect (born 1781)
 18 June – John Burns, surgeon (born 1775) (in PS Orion disaster)
 12 July – Robert Stevenson, civil engineer noted for lighthouses (born 1772)
 3 December – John Gibb, civil engineer and contractor (born 1776)
 29 December – William Hamilton Maxwell, novelist (born 1792 in Ireland)
 Approximate date – Walter Sutherland, last native speaker of the Norn language on Unst

See also 
 Timeline of Scottish history
 1850 in the United Kingdom

References 

 
Years of the 19th century in Scotland
Scotland
1850s in Scotland